Zhuxinzhuang station  is a station on Line 8 and Changping Line of the Beijing Subway.

It is a cross-platform interchange between the two lines. The Line 8 tracks are the inner tracks, while the Changping Line tracks are the outer tracks. It is the current northern terminus of Line 8.

Station Layout 
The station has elevated dual-island platforms with a cross platform interchange. On one side, originating line 8 trains interchange with southbound Changping line trains to Xitucheng, whilst on the other, terminating line 8 trains interchange with northbound Changping line trains towards Changping Xishankou.

Exits 
There are 4 exits, lettered A1, A2, B1, and B2. Exits A2 and B2 are accessible.

References

External links

Beijing Subway stations in Changping District
Railway stations in China opened in 2010